Live at the Brixton Academy is a recording of The Brian May Band's first show in London on June 15, 1993. The album was released on CD, Cassette, LP and VHS in 1994, and remains the group's only release as a collective.

Overview
The album is an almost complete and unedited version of the concert. Their performance of John Lennon's "God (The Dream Is Over)" was not included on the album due to copyright issues. Keyboard player Spike Edney had to play a second solo (neither are on the CD, the first being on the video) after May had technical problems before playing "Last Horizon". Also, "Back To The Light", "Tie Your Mother Down", "Love Token", "Headlong", "Let Your Heart Rule Your Head", "Resurrection" (in particular, Cozy Powell's drum solo), "We Will Rock You" and "Hammer to Fall" are all slightly shortened on the CD, but appear in full on the 90-minute video of the same event. The spoken part after "Love Token" has been cut because it contained too many profanities, but it can be heard fully on the unofficial audience recording.

The tracks "'39 / Let Your Heart Rule Your Head", "Last Horizon" and "We Will Rock You" from the performance were also released as b-sides on several versions of "Last Horizon" single.

Track listing
All tracks by Brian May, except where noted

 "Back to the Light"
 "Driven by You"
 "Tie Your Mother Down"
 "Love Token"
 "Headlong"
 "Love of My Life" (Freddie Mercury)
 "'39" / "Let Your Heart Rule Your Head"
 "Too Much Love Will Kill You" (May, Frank Musker, Elizabeth Lamers)
 "Since You've Been Gone" (Russ Ballard)
 "Now I'm Here"
 "Guitar Extravagance"
 "Resurrection" (May, Cozy Powell, Jamie Page)
 "Last Horizon"
 "We Will Rock You"
 "Hammer to Fall"

Personnel 
Brian May: vocals, lead guitar
Jamie Moses: rhythm guitar, vocals
Spike Edney: Hammond organ, synthesizer, piano, vocals
Neil Murray: bass
Cozy Powell: drums
Catherine Porter: vocals
Shelley Preston:  vocals, tambourine

References

Brian May albums
1994 live albums
Parlophone live albums
Albums recorded at the Brixton Academy